The Midland Community Center (MCC) is a nearly  complex on three levels in the heart of Midland, Michigan that provides comprehensive social, recreational and personal development opportunities for all residents.

History
The Midland Community Center was founded January 14, 1919, in conjunction with the very first bowling alley in Midland. The community center became a trend-setter, and other sports and pastimes were gradually introduced to the community, including basketball, handball, volleyball, table tennis, pickleball, archery, tennis and softball.

The first building at the site of the current center was dedicated on October 30, 1955, and the $1.5 million cost was covered by gifts from the Dow Chemical Company. It has been expanded several times since then. An indoor rifle range was open during the 1960s and National Rifle Association sanctioned classes in marksmanship were offered for air rifle (BB gun) and small bore (.22). They were discontinued in the early 1970s due to lack of interest. 
During the summer of 2005, the MCC locker rooms were completely renovated. The lockers themselves were the originals installed when the center was built and had fifty years of use. 
In addition to locker replacement, separate family and adult sections were built, the flooring was upgraded and plumbing fixtures were updated.
Also in 2005, MCC recorded 900,000 member visits, which is equivalent to 2,465 persons participating in an activity every day of the year.

Umbrella structure
A new corporation was formed in 2005, the Greater Midland Community Centers, Inc. (GMCC), which provides guidance and assistance to five existing non-profit recreation centers in Midland County, including the Midland Community Center.  
Two classrooms at the MCC received a makeover to become the offices for the GMCC personnel. At the same time, GMCC announced a $5.1 million fundraising campaign to "enhance the quality of life for Midlanders," according to GMCC CEO Chris Tointon. Individuals and businesses contributed to the project, but the majority came from local charitable trusts including the 
Alden & Vada Dow Foundation, the Dow Chemical Company Foundation, the Dow Corning Corporation Foundation, The Herbert H. & Grace A. Dow Foundation, the Midland Area Community Foundation, the Charles J. Strosacker Foundation and the Rollin M. Gerstacker Foundation. The money paid for three projects, but more than half the total was used to create an "outdoor campus" at MCC.

Expansion
The city averages 141 days each year below freezing, so the MCC had always concentrated on indoor activities. A$2.5 million expansion in 2008 changed that. Part of the plan involved moving two homes and demolishing a third that was located across the street from the center that occupied land destined to become a new parking area, outdoor running track, outdoor basketball courts and a children's playscape. Walking and biking trails were also created on what is now a  campus.

To accommodate the new amenities, George Street was closed by the city and became the driveway to the new parking lot; the intersection at George and Haley Streets disappeared. A new entrance with a passenger pickup/drop-off was constructed on Jefferson Avenue. The entire project was completed in late 2008.

In 2009, the MCC celebrated their 90th year of service.

Programs
The organization provides the community with a diverse group of activities that include youth and adult classes, drop-in sessions and leagues for athletics.  
In addition to aquatics, the indoor sports of basketball, volleyball, pickleball, gymnastics and curling are featured. Outdoor sports such as flag football are organized in cooperation with the Midland Parks and Recreation department.
Offerings in fine arts are continuously scheduled and include art lessons, voice and/or instrument lessons and dance classes.  
Specialty fitness activities that are sponsored include fencing, martial arts (karate & judo), Yoga, boxing (non-contact), billiards, table tennis, pickleball and badminton.

Funding
The United Way of Midland County provides significant funding for the center's operations. For 2009, UW allocated $282,900 for education programs, $61,500 for self-sufficiency programs and $270,600 for health programs. The total of $615,000 was 16.4% of UWs budget. The MCC also relies on local companies to underwrite specific programs and free activities.

Deli
For the first time in its history, a food service business opened inside the facility in June 2010. The Crossroads Deli is operated by a former resident who received culinary training at The Art Institute of Colorado before returning to Midland. The eatery is now closed.

References

External links
Dow RunWalk website
Greater Midland Community Centers website
Midland Community Center website
Midland Curling Club website

Midland, Michigan
Community centers in Michigan
Non-profit organizations based in Michigan
Buildings and structures in Midland County, Michigan
Tourist attractions in Midland County, Michigan